Krasnovsky is a rural locality (a khutor) in Tishanskoye Rural Settlement, Nekhayevsky District, Volgograd Oblast, Russia. The population was 72 as of 2010. There are 5 streets.

Geography 
Krasnovsky is located on the right bank of the Khopyor River, 19 km southeast of Nekhayevskaya (the district's administrative centre) by road. Artanovsky is the nearest rural locality.

References 

Rural localities in Nekhayevsky District